Sguman Coinntich (879 m) is a mountain in the Northwest Highlands, Scotland, east of the village of Dornie in Ross-shire.

Sguman Coinntich is the highest of twin peaks, its subsidiary top Ben Killilan rising to 756 m. The mountain rises above the head of Loch Long. The climb is mainly along rough terrain, but its summit makes for a fantastic viewpoint.

References

Mountains and hills of the Northwest Highlands
Marilyns of Scotland
Corbetts